Pawnee County is a county in the U.S. state of Nebraska. As of the 2010 United States Census, the population was 2,773. Its county seat is Pawnee City.

In the Nebraska license plate system, Pawnee County is represented by the prefix 54 (it had the fifty-fourth-largest number of vehicles registered in the county when the license plate system was established in 1922).

History
Pawnee County was formed in 1854. It was named for the Pawnee Native American tribe.

On May 30, 1879, the "Irving, Kansas Tornado" passed through Pawnee County. This tornado measured F4 on the Fujita scale, and had a damage path 800 yards wide and 100 miles.

Geography
Pawnee County lies on the south line of Nebraska. Its south boundary line abuts the north boundary line of the state of Kansas. The Big Nemaha River flows southeastward through the NE corner of the county, and smaller local drainages flow upward through the county to discharge into the Big Nemaha. The county's terrain consists of rolling hills, with its planar areas largely devoted to agriculture.

Major highways

  Nebraska Highway 4
  Nebraska Highway 8
  Nebraska Highway 50
  Nebraska Highway 65
  Nebraska Highway 99
  Nebraska Highway 105

Adjacent counties

 Richardson County − east
 Nemaha County, Kansas − southeast
 Marshall County, Kansas − southwest
 Gage County − west
 Johnson County − north
 Nemaha County − northeast

Protected areas

 Bowwood State Wildlife Management Area
 Burchard State Wildlife Management Area
 Mayberry State Wildlife Management Area
 Pawnee Prairie State Wildlife Management Area
 Prairie Knoll State Wildlife Management Area
 Table Rock State Wildlife Management Area

Demographics

As of the 2000 United States Census, there were 3,087 people, 1,339 households, and 850 families in the county. The population density was 7 people per square mile (3/km2). There were 1,587 housing units at an average density of 4 per square mile (1/km2). The racial makeup of the county was 98.87% White, 0.19% Native American, 0.26% Asian, 0.03% from other races, and 0.65% from two or more races. 0.68% of the population were Hispanic or Latino of any race.

There were 1,339 households, out of which 24.40% had children under the age of 18 living with them, 54.80% were married couples living together, 5.60% had a female householder with no husband present, and 36.50% were non-families. 32.90% of all households were made up of individuals, and 20.20% had someone living alone who was 65 years of age or older. The average household size was 2.27 and the average family size was 2.86.

The county population contained 22.70% under the age of 18, 5.10% from 18 to 24, 21.00% from 25 to 44, 24.20% from 45 to 64, and 27.10% who were 65 years of age or older. The median age was 46 years. For every 100 females there were 92.50 males. For every 100 females age 18 and over, there were 91.30 males.

The median income for a household in the county was $29,000, and the median income for a family was $36,326. Males had a median income of $24,770 versus $17,976 for females. The per capita income for the county was $16,687. About 6.80% of families and 11.00% of the population were below the poverty line, including 13.60% of those under age 18 and 11.80% of those age 65 or over.

Communities

Cities
 Pawnee City (county seat)

Villages

 Burchard
 Du Bois
 Lewiston
 Steinauer
 Table Rock

Politics
Pawnee County voters have been Republican-leaning for decades. In no national election since 1936 has the county selected a Democratic Party candidate.

See also
 List of people from Pawnee County, Nebraska
 National Register of Historic Places listings in Pawnee County, Nebraska

References

External links

 
 Pawnee County tourism website

 
Nebraska counties
Populated places established in 1854
1854 establishments in Nebraska Territory